

About SWA 
The Screenwriters Association (SWA, formerly Film Writers' Association - Regd. Under the Trade Union Act 1926, Regd. No. 3726) is a trade union for screenwriters and lyricists in India's film, TV, and digital media industries. It also accepts aspiring authors, novelists, playwrights, and journalists who seek to join these mediums. The SWA fosters feelings of fraternity, sorority, and unity among its members, promoting high standards of professional conduct and integrity while providing learning opportunities to upgrade their scriptwriting and lyric-writing skills.
 
The association regulates the relationship between members and producer bodies through collective bargaining via Minimum Basic Contracts for film, TV, and digital media. It secures and safeguards its members' interests, rights, compensation, and privileges related to their professional engagement and working conditions. The SWA addresses disputes between members and producer bodies concerning contractual obligations, copyright infringement, and refutation of credits and/or remuneration, providing legal assistance when needed.
 
The SWA also registers scripts, lyrics, and stories written by its members through its office and website to safeguard their copyright. It represents members on delegations, commissions, and committees, among others, discussing issues related to screenwriting. The association also runs welfare activities for needy and elderly members, including medical aid, pensions, and scholarships for their children. While the SWA doesn't secure employment or contracts/assignments for its members, it provides valuable resources and support for industry workers.

History 
The legacy of SWA traces back to 1950 when, during an open house weekly gathering of cultural and literary meetings in a humble Matunga flat of Music Director Anil Biswas, K. A. Abbas, Ramanand Sagar, Dr. Safdar Shah, Mahesh Kaul, Narendra Sharma, Chandrashekhar, Madhusudan, P.N.Rangeen, and Amrit Lal Nagar conceived the idea of the Film Writers Association. Over the years, legendary names such as Sahir Ludhianvi, Qamar Jalalabadi, Pt. Mukhram Sharma, Majrooh Sultanpuri, Ali Sardar Jafri, Rahi Masoom Raza, Anand Bakshi, and Sachin Bhowmick, among others, have actively participated in advancing the association's objectives.

Governance 
Duly elected biennially by its members, the association is governed by the Executive Committee (EC) comprising 31 elected members (7 Office Bearers, 21 Regular Members, and 3 Associate Members).
The 7 Officer Bearers oversee the functioning of the EC, helping it take decisions effectively and efficiently, and are responsible for implementing the objectives of the Association.

The PRESIDENT presides over the meetings of the Executive Committee.

The two VICE PRESIDENTS fulfil the duties of the President in his/her absence.

The GENERAL SECRETARY serves as the Chief Executive Officer, on an honorary basis, of the Association and is responsible for the day-to-day functioning of its office.

The two JOINT SECRETARIES assist the General Secretary in the performance of his/her tasks and duties, and in his/her absence.

The TREASURER is responsible for maintaining due accounts of the finances of the Association

Current EC 
President – Robin Bhatt,|
Vice Presidents – Preeti Mamgain, Mitesh Shah|
General Secretary – Zaman Habib|
Joint Secretaries – Satyam Tripathy, Pooja Tolani|
Treasurer – Danish Javed|
EC Members – Abhijeet Deshpande, Abhiruchi Chand, Anjum Rajabali, Debashish Irengbam, Dhananjay Kumar, Hitesh Kewalya, Hussain Haidry, Marmabanda Gavhane, Mitesh Shah, Nikhil Vyas, Neha Pawar, Palak Bhambri, Puneet Sharma, Rajesh Dubey, Saiwyn Quadras, Saket Chaudhary, Satyanshu Singh, Shailendra Singh Sodhi, Swati, Sweksha Bhagat, Vinod Ranganath, Deepanjan Roy, Gaurav Patki, Persis Chirag Sodawaterwala

Post Holders in the Past 
Hon. Presidents - K.A. Abbas 1958-61, Rajinder Singh Bedi 1961-63, Mukhram Sharma 1964-65, Sahir Ludhianvi 1963-64/65-66/67-70, Vrajendra Gaur 1966-67, Krishan Chander 1970-76, Satish Bhatnagar 1976-77/78-89, Kamleshwar 1977-78, Ali Sardar Jafri 1989-90, Ali Raza 1990-98, Jagmohan Kapoor 1998-2005, Hasan Kamaal 2005-08, Jalees Sherwani 2008-12, Vinay Shukla 2012-14, Jalees Sherwani 2014-16, Preeti Mamgain 2016-18, Robin Bhatt 2018-20, Robin Bhatt (Ad-hoc) 2020-2021, Robin Bhatt 2021-2023

Hon. General Secretaries - Ramanand Sagar 1954-55, Vishram Bedekar 1955-57, Shashi Bhushan 1961-63, Qamar Jalalabadi 1957-61/63-64, Mohinder Nath 1965-66/68-74, Hari Malik 1966-68, Madhusudan 1974-77, Ranjan Bose 1977-88, Ali Raza 1988-90, Jalees Sherwani 1990-93, Tejnath Zar 1993-98, Rajinder Singh Atish 1998-06, Ved Rahi 2006-08, B.R.Ishara 2008-10, Imteyaz Hussein 2010-12, Kamlesh Pandey 2012-16, Zaman Habib 2016-18, Sunil Salgia 2018-20, Vinod Ranganath(Ad-hoc) 2020-21, Zaman Habib 2021-2023

SWA Sub Committees 

SWA has several sub-committees appointed by the Executive Committee to fulfil its objectives and aims, which periodically report to the Executive Committee. These sub-committees play a crucial role in fulfilling the objectives and aims of SWA, ensuring that the interests of screenwriters are protected, and their welfare is taken care of:
 
Dispute Settlement Committee: This quasi-legal body mediates disputes between members, including breach of contractual obligations, copyright infringement, and refutation of credits and/or remuneration, where the intervention of the Association is relevant and necessary.
 
Membership Verification Committee: The Membership Verification Sub-Committee scrutinizes and verifies the Life, Regular, and Associate membership applications.
 
MBC Sub-Committees: Four MBC sub-committees (Film, TV, Lyricist, and Web) draft Minimum Basic Contracts (model contracts) and minimum rate cards, ensuring they are accepted as standard industry practices via collective bargaining and negotiations. These contracts safeguard the fees, credit, and copyright of screenwriters.
 
Legal Aid Committee: The Legal Aid Committee evaluates the merits of a matter recommended for legal aid and coordinates and negotiates with legal counsels, advocates, or other necessary persons.
 
Welfare Committee: This committee administers and executes welfare schemes in the form of medical aid, pensions, and scholarships for the children of the Association members.
 
Events Committee: The Event Sub-Committee conducts events such as seminars, panel discussions, webinars, and pitching events that promote the aims and objectives of the Association.
 
Education Committee: The Education Committee provides a platform for SWA members and other screenwriters to learn and educate themselves on the craft and nuances of screenwriting, helping them become better screenwriters through workshops, script labs, and other avenues.
 
Awards Committee: The Awards Committee manages and plans the annual SWA Awards, the only awards in India dedicated entirely to screenwriters and lyricists of Hindi Feature Films, Hindi TV shows, and Hindi Web series.
 
Media Committee: The Media Sub-Committee encourages the presence and prominence of screenwriters by educating, sensitizing, and promoting the appreciation of screenwriting in media and the public mind while also spreading awareness about the struggle and importance of SWA.

Constitution & By-Laws 
The association is governed by its constitution and Bylaws. Please refer *Official Website

SWA Membership 

Membership of the Screenwriters Association is meant for screenwriters (including writers and lyricists writing for films, TV, audio formats, digital media, or any new media), who reside within the boundary of the Union of India and are above 18 years of age. One can become an SWA member by submitting the duly filled SWA Membership Form along with the required documents and applicable fees at SWA Office, OR by logging on to its website. SWA Membership is approved only upon the verification of all the required documents. Time Taken: 10-12 working days
Four membership types are Fellow, Associate, Regular, and Life (same as Regular Membership with one-time upgrade fees).

Regular/Life Member
 
Writers who have had their work released as a Feature Film (minimum of 70 minutes) in a cinema hall for ticketed viewing, with the credit of either Story, Screenplay, Dialogue, Lyrics, or Written by.
Writers whose work as a Feature Film (minimum 70 minutes) was screened at any film festival, in India or abroad, with a FIAPF accreditation.
Writers who have had their work released as a Feature Film (minimum 70 minutes) or as a Web-Series on a Digital Platform with the credit of either Created by, Story, Screenplay, Dialogue, or Written by (with a minimum of 70 cumulative minutes being credited to them).
Writers who have written either a serial, show, or program released on satellite TV (with a minimum of 70 cumulative minutes credited to them) with the credit of either Created, Story, Screenplay, Dialogue, or Written by.
Writers who have written the lyrics of at least three songs that have appeared in a released Feature Film, in a TV serial, or a web series with the credit of a lyricist or songwriter.
 

Associate Member

Writers who have been professionally engaged, via a written legal contract, by a Producer^/Director^^/Writer^^^ (defined below) to write/co-write the Story, Screenplay, or Dialogue or to write the Lyrics for two songs of a feature film/s (of a minimum of 70 minutes) or a TV show (cumulatively a minimum of 70 minutes) or film (of at least 70 minutes) in the digital media, or lyrics for two songs in music videos, with the first fee installment, as per the contract, having been credited to the writer’s bank account.

^Producer – Indian Production House/Record Label/Independent Producer registered with a recognized Producers Association or the Copyright Society for record labels, screenwriters, or lyricists in India.

^^Director – Members of IFTDA or any recognized Directors’ Association.

^^^Writer – Regular/Life Members of SWA or any other four screenwriter associations in India, viz. The Telugu Cine Writers Association (Hyderabad), The South Indian Writers Association (Chennai), The FEFKA Writers Union (Ernakulam), and The Cine Writers Association of West Bengal (Kolkata).

Writers who have received the credit of ‘Additional Writer’ or ‘Associate Writer’ in a released work in any of these formats are also eligible for membership in this category.
Applicants who have completed a Degree, Diploma, or Certificate course, of at least one year, in screenwriting or with screenwriting as the major subject from any university or institute affiliated with a university or any government-recognized institute.
 

Fellow Member

Any person who has a passion for screenwriting is eligible for Fellow membership.
A Fellow member is allowed to register his/her work at SWA. However, s/he cannot attend SWA AGMs, vote, or stand for SWA elections. S/he can attend SWA events open to other members, like seminars, conferences, workshops, etc.
The duration of Fellow membership is three years, within which period s/he should either get himself/herself upgraded to Associate or Regular/Life category, or else the Fellow membership will expire. If s/he wishes to become a Fellow member again, s/he will have to reapply by fulfilling all the application protocols

Functions of SWA 

Dispute Settlement: Any member aggrieved by or having a claim against any person (member or non-member), or any person having a grievance or claim in respect of the member, wherein such dispute has arisen out of the member’s scope of work as a screenwriter, may file a formal complaint with the Dispute Settlement Committee (DSC). In any case, either the complainant or the respondent to the dispute should be a member of the Screenwriters Association.
Every new case first gets analyzed and studied by the SWA’s Legal Officer, and then briefed to the DSC. On a fixed date, the DSC hears the parties and records their statements, scrutinizes their documents and records evidence, and thereafter proceeds to settle the dispute.
 
Script Registration: Registering one’s literary and dramatic work like a story, screenplay, script, etc. with the Screenwriters Association (SWA) means creating a public record of the date of the creation of the Work. The registration is prima facie evidence in the case of the dispute related to the first date of creation of work. Though mere registration cannot prevent plagiarism, it can produce the registered material to any legal proceeding or arbitration in a dispute related to the first date of the creation/existence of the Work to verify the authorship of the same.
 
SWA registration cannot be used as prima facie evidence in the case of the ownership-related dispute of a literary/dramatic work.
 
SWA does not read/verify the content of the work. It relies on the detailed undertaking given by the author while registering the work. ‘General Information’ like Name of the member, Registration Number, number of pages, title, date and time of registration, and declaration are saved with SWA. In case of online registrations, a member shall have access to the registered work temporarily saved in his/her account for five (5) days counting from the registration date. The registered work will automatically get deleted from the account and SWA server after five (5) days. Only the person who has registered the work shall have access to the work in this period and no SWA Staff can access/read the registered work at any time. However, in judicial intervention, SWA does provide access to ‘General Information’ to law enforcement authorities as required.
 
Welfare: Screenwriters Association, under its various welfare schemes, provides pensions, education aids (for the wards), and medical aid to its members. All medical, and educational allowances or relief to members is managed by the Welfare Committee, based on each application supported by relevant paperwork. The welfare Committee seeks approval of the EC in cases where the amount to be disbursed exceeds the limit of Rs.50,000/-. Members who satisfy the following conditions can apply for welfare aid. a) Regular or Life member whose membership duration is a minimum of 5 years. b) A Regular or Life member whose membership is not in arrears. c) In the case of pension, members of age 70 and above only can apply.

Events & Initiatives 

SWA Awards: The Screenwriters Association awards ceremony, dubbed “SWA Awards,” was launched in 2020 as part of the association’s Diamond Jubilee Year. SWA Awards is India's first and only award for screenwriters and lyricists of Hindi Films, TV Serials/Shows, and Web Series, with winners being decided by eminent screenwriters and lyricists from various mediums of the entertainment industry. 
 
The first-ever SWA Awards was held virtually on September 27, 2020, and awards were given in 15 categories across TV, Films, Web Series & Lyrics.
 
The second edition of the SWA Awards 2021 ceremony for the work released in 2020 across Feature Films, Television, Web Series, and Lyrics was held online on 27th February 2022.
 
The third edition of SWA Awards 2022 for Hindi Feature Films, Web Series, Television shows, and lyrics released in 2021 was held on November 9th, 2022. Eminent personalities like Shabana Azmi, Javed Akhtar, and Vishal Bhardwaj graced the event hosted by Satyam Tripathy (Convener SWA Awards 2022 & SWA Joint Secretary), with close to 400 SWA members present in the audience.
Refer to *Official SWA Awards Website for the list of winners. 
 

SWA Script Lab 2022:  SWA Script Lab 2022 was announced on 8th September 2021, receiving an overwhelming response of 601 entries, with each entry including a synopsis of the film and the first ten pages of the screenplay.
 
After a thorough evaluation, the top 30 scripts were shortlisted and announced on 9th December 2021. The shortlisted participants submitted the completed first draft of their scripts by 10th January 2022.
 
During the second stage, six readers arrived at the final six winning scripts, which are 13 Days by Sindhu Sreenivasa Murthy & Gaurav Krishna, Kashi Kothi Ka Kul by Akshay Asthana, A Dinner at Khan's by Syed Shadan, Meiktila by Nimish Tanna, Dev Dikshit by Sandiip N Patil & Kriya Karam by Nipun Angrish & Gundeep Kaur. One-on-one mentoring sessions between writers and mentors began in May and concluded on 18th June 2022.
 

SWA Pitch Fest 2022: SWA Pitch Fest 2022 was held on 18th August 2022, and the 25 best scripts out of the top 60 scripts shortlisted for Script Lab were identified and invited to pitch their scripts to 20 production houses, producers, and agencies. The event was preceded by workshops organized by SWA to help writers prepare an effective pitch. The invitee producers were provided with separate stalls, and the 25 writers had the opportunity to pitch their work to all the producers on a one-to-one basis. The producers/studios that participated in SWA Pitch Fest 2022 were: Bang Bang Media Corp, Chalkboard Entertainment, Collective Artists Network, Culver Max Entertainment (Formerly Sony), Excel Entertainment, Junglee Pictures, Lionsgate, Maddock Films, Matter Entertainment, Phantom Films, Posham Pa Pictures, Roy Kapur Films, Sikhya Entertainment, Star Studio – Disney, Suitable Pictures, Tulsea Media,Tusk Tale Films, Yali Dreamworks, Yash Raj Films, Zee 5.
 

Awards Winners Roundtable: The Events Sub-Committee conducted online Roundtables with the winners of SWA Awards 2021. Four different roundtables with winners of Lyrics, Television, Web Series & Feature Films were streamed live on SWA's Facebook page. The SWA Awards 2022 Winners Roundtable took place in Mumbai on the 27th of January, 2023, at the Celebrations Club, Andheri West, Mumbai—winners from various categories, spanning feature films, television, web series, and songs.
 
 
Indian Screenwriters Conference (ISC): The biggest conference of screenwriters in India is organized by the SWA every two years. The three-day conference provides insight into the world of screenwriting through panel discussions on various topics. The panels consist of celebrated screenwriters and lyricists not only from the Hindi Film Industry but from pan India.
 
Since its inception in 2006, the 6th edition was held at the St Andrew’s Auditorium, Bandra, Mumbai, from the 10th to the 12th of November 2022. The theme of the conference was, “WHO AM I? Is our unique storytelling a boon or a bane?”
Mr. Mani Ratnam graced the event as the Chief Guest for this year’s ISC, while noted Screenwriter and Rajya Sabha member Mr. Vijayendra Prasad was the guest of Honor. The three-day-long conference was filled with panel discussions covering topics from Films, Television, OTT, and Lyrics.
It was also the first time that the conference introduced master classes on TV Writing, web series writing, and Films. The sessions were taken by eminent writers Sriram Raghvan (Films), Raj & DK (Web Series) & Mrinal Jha & Gajra Kottary (Television).
Noted writer-producer Prakash Jha, Atika Chohan, Chandan Kumar, Puneet Krishna, Saiwyn Quadras, Kausar Munir, Raj Shekhar, Ishita Moitra, Alankrita Srivastava, Syam Puskaran, Abhijeet Deshpande, Pushkar, and Gayatri were among the panelists across 13 different sessions.
Majrooh Sulanpuri and Sachin Bhaumick were also felicitated on the last day of the conference by famous actor Mr. Sachin Pilgaonkar and senior screenwriter and Member of Rajya Sabha Mr. Vijayendra Prasad

External links 
Official Website
Official SWA Awards Website

References

Organisations based in Mumbai
Trade unions in India
Film organisations in India
Scriptwriters' trade unions
Film industry in Mumbai
International Affiliation of Writers Guilds
Screenwriting organizations
Communications and media organisations based in India
1954 establishments in Bombay State
Trade unions established in 1954